Wilson Marcy Powell (July 18, 1903 – March 2, 1974) was an American physicist and a member of the Physics department at the University of California, Berkeley.

Biography 
The son of Harvard lawyer Wilson Marcy Powell Sr. and Elsie Knapp, Wilson was born in Litchfield, Connecticut. He matriculated into Harvard College in 1922 and graduated in 1926. During his undergraduate years, Powell went on two solar eclipse expeditions sponsored by Swarthmore College. He participated in his final eclipse expedition to the Arctic Circle nearly 50 years later.

At the behest of his father, Powell entered Harvard Law School in 1926. However, he had always known that he wanted to do physics and was unable to focus on his law studies. His mother, Elsie persuaded her husband to allow their son to withdraw from the law school after a year and to begin graduate work in physics at Harvard. Powell completed a Ph.D. in Physics in 1933 under Theodore Lyman IV.

Early career 
Powell worked as an assistant teacher at Harvard and Radcliffe from 1933 to 1935, and took on additional work at the Woods Hole Oceanographic Institute. He taught physics at Connecticut College from 1935 to 1937, and then Kenyon College in Ohio from 1937 to 1941.

Research on cosmic rays 
In 1935, Powell became a research fellow at the Franklin Institute's Bartol Laboratory and began investigation of cosmic rays. During the Depression years, funds for research were difficult to secure. Powell managed to obtain financing for his research on cosmic rays and the construction of bigger and better cloud chambers from the Rumford Fund of the American Academy of Arts and Sciences, the Carnegie Institute, the Committee on Research of the American Philosophical Society and the Fund for Astrophysical Research. While at Bartol, Powell constructed two cloud chambers for cosmic ray study and developed a source of light at a much lower cost than the lighting used at the time.

Awarded a Guggenheim Fellowship in 1941, Powell put together the Kenyon Cosmic Ray Expedition, and took a cloud chamber to the top of Mount Evans in Colorado. He was searching for a heavier-than-electron particle, known as the "mesotron." In a 17-foot-long trailer, a laboratory on wheels at a height of 14,125 feet, Powell and assistant Henry Meyer took about 12,000 photographs in order to capture a photo of the particle. He had made improvements to the cloud chamber, such as a new lighting system that enabled him to take pictures in one thirty-thousandth of a second. During this expedition, Henry Allen Moe, then president of the Guggenheim Foundation, Professor Raymond Birge, head of the physics department at the University of California, Berkeley, and German physicist Hans Bethe visited the mountaintop laboratory. In 1941, Powell went to the University of California, Berkeley to continue cosmic ray research with Robert Brode.

Scientific contribution during the Manhattan Project 
Upon finishing the Guggenheim Fellowship in 1942, Powell began work in the Manhattan Project. He became head of the magnet group, which designed the magnets for the calutrons. Developed by Ernest O. Lawrence, these large machines were used to separate uranium isotopes. Powell worked on the pilot models first at the Radiation Laboratory at University of California, Berkeley and then on the racetracks at Oak Ridge, Tennessee.

Postwar work at the radiation laboratory 
Powell was made an associate professor of physics at the University of California, Berkeley in 1946, and continued to lead the magnet group at the Radiation Laboratory after the war. He contributed to the development of the 184-inch synchrocyclotron and the 300 MeV electron synchrotron. He also constructed the 30-inch propane chamber. He introduced the use of scotchlite to illuminate the bubble chamber and was actively involved in the design of Argonne Laboratory's 12-foot heavy liquid chamber.

In 1951, he was made a professor of physics at Berkeley. While directing the research of 33 Ph.D. students, Powell and his colleagues at the Lawrence Berkeley Laboratory published approximately 40 papers. Because Powell held a particular interest in optics, he taught the upper level optics courses.

Musical interests 
Powell played several instruments, including the violin and the bagpipe. Collaborating with W.F. Fry, a physicist at the University of Wisconsin, Powell conducted research on the construction on violins, measuring such famous instruments as the Stradivarius and Guarnerius violins. The prototypes of the violins created were given to students. One was given to his granddaughter Heidi Powell Priddy.

Personal life 
Powell married Fredrika Richardson in 1930 in Cambridge, Massachusetts. They had three children, Wilson M., David Richardson and Fredrika. They divorced in 1955. Powell married Dorothy J. Gardner in 1956, and adopted her daughter Claire. His grandchildren from Wilson M. include Mayan Archaeologist Christopher Powell, Cyber Security Consultant Gordon Powell, artist/filmmaker Heidi Powell Priddy,  and Architect Benjamin Powell. Grandchildren from David Richardson include writer-producer J Dakota Powell and Gregory Powell. Grandchildren from Fredrika (Mrs. James Spillman) include Eric Spillman, Meg Spillman and Toby Spillman.

Publications 
 
 
 Tracy, J.; Powell, W.M. (1949), Star Fragments in Oxygen and Helium under Bombardment by 90 MeV Neutrons, University of California, Berkeley, Radiation Laboratory
 Brueckner, K.; Powell, W.M. (1949), Charged Particles Emitted by Carbon Bombarded by 90 MeV Neutrons, University of California, Berkeley, Radiation Laboratory
 
 
 
 Powell, W.M.; Oswald, L.O. (November 30, 1956), The Geneva Cloud Chamber, University of California, Berkeley, Radiation Laboratory

References

External links 
 Science: Anti-Physics, TIME (April 21, 1958).

20th-century American physicists
1903 births
1974 deaths
Harvard Law School alumni
Harvard College alumni